Webb Glacier may refer to:

 Webb Glacier (South Georgia)
 Webb Glacier (Victoria Land)